Joe Sparks is an American video game developer, animator, songwriter, web publisher, and multimedia consultant from San Francisco, California.

Sparks created the Radiskull and Devil Doll web-cartoons published on the Macromedia Shockwave website around 2000–01. Other published media includes the videogames Total Distortion and Spaceship Warlock.

Career
Joe Sparks is a former guitarist of the Californian deathrock band Burning Image. As an original member of the band, he did attend reunion shows.

Joe Sparks was an early employee of Paracomp, which had become Macromedia in 1992.  He left to found Pop Rocket, which produced the critically acclaimed video game Total Distortion, to moderate success.  Pop Rocket folded in 1995, with Sparks returning to Macromedia in 1997 as a creative developer.

Sparks' work has been instrumental in the formation and lasting success of shockwave.com, mainly due to the popularity of Radiskull and Devil Doll for which he created all the graphics, animation and music.

A pioneer of the interactive web, Joe Sparks has been asked to speak at industry conferences and educational events.

He currently works as a consultant and contractor for development and design.

References

External links 
 Sparks' personal home page

American animators
Video game programmers
Flash artists
Year of birth missing (living people)
Living people